Ben Condon (born 13 July 2000) is an Australian professional rugby league footballer who plays as a  forward for the 
Manly-Warringah Sea Eagles in the National Rugby League.

He previously played for the North Queensland Cowboys in the NRL.

Background 
Born in Roma, Queensland, Condon played his junior rugby league for the Wallumbilla-Surat Red Bulls.

He attended Rockhampton Grammar School before being signed by the North Queensland Cowboys in 2017.

Playing career

Early career
In 2016, Condon played for the Central Queensland Capras Cyril Connell Cup team before moving up to their Mal Meninga Cup team in 2017. In 2018, Condon moved to Townsville, Queensland and joined the Townsville Blackhawks. After starting the year with the Mal Meninga Cup side, he later progressed to their Hastings Deering Colts team, scoring a try in their Grand Final loss to the Norths Devils.

In 2019, he spent the season with the Blackhawks' under-20 side and represented the Queensland under-20 team. On 24 September 2019, Condon signed a development contract with the North Queensland Cowboys, joining their NRL squad.

2020
In 2020, Condon started the season playing for the Northern Pride in the Queensland Cup.

In Round 19 of the 2020 NRL season, he made his NRL debut for North Queensland against Penrith.

2021 & 2022
Condon made 11 appearances for North Queensland in the 2021 NRL season as the club finished 15th on the table. On 19 October, Condon signed a three-year deal to join Manly-Warringah starting in 2023.

Statistics

NRL
 Statistics are correct to the end of the 2020 season

References

External links 

 North Queensland Cowboys profile

2000 births
Living people
Australian rugby league players
North Queensland Cowboys players
Northern Pride RLFC players
Rugby league second-rows
Rugby league players from Queensland
People from Roma, Queensland